Matanuska Peak is a  mountain summit located in the Chugach Mountains, in Matanuska-Susitna Borough in the U.S. state of Alaska. The nearest higher peak is Frontier Peak,  to the southeast. Matanuska Peak's name was officially approved in 1969 by the United States Geological Survey, and derives from the Matanuska River, a native name on maps since 1897. "Matanuska" is derived from the Russian term for the "copper river people". The Matanuska Peak Trail is a five mile one-way hike with 5,670 feet of elevation gain and minor scrambling. The months June through October offer the most favorable weather and snow-free trail conditions to climb this peak. The Matanuska Peak Challenge is a strenuous race run in August each year.

Climate

Based on the Köppen climate classification, Matanuska Peak is located in a subarctic climate zone with long, cold, snowy winters, and mild summers. Temperatures can drop below −20 °C with wind chill factors below −30 °C. Precipitation runoff from the peak drains into tributaries of the Matanuska River, which in turn is a tributary of the Knik River.

See also

List of mountain peaks of Alaska
Geology of Alaska

References

External links
 Matanuska Peak weather: Mountain Forecast
 Matanuska Peak Trail

Mountains of Alaska
Mountains of Matanuska-Susitna Borough, Alaska